Lawrence Kimberley Brett "Laurie" Keene (born 2 January 1961) is a former Australian rules footballer who played for the West Coast Eagles in the VFL/AFL.

Tall and athletic, Laurie Keene was recruited to West Coast from Subiaco, where he had been a member of premiership sides in 1986 and 1988. He could play as a key position forward or in the ruck and had topped Subiaco's goalkicking in 1985 with 70 goals as well as winning their 'Fairest and best' award in 1986. He kicked West Coast's first goal (and score) in VFL/AFL football.

His career at West Coast was often interrupted by injury, most notably an Achilles tendon injury which ended his VFL/AFL career, but he had a solid debut season with 25 goals, which included a then club record haul of six against Carlton at Princes Park.

Keene returned to Subiaco after his stint at West Coast and played with the club until 1994, amassing 141 games.

At interstate level, he was a regular Western Australia representative, and earned selection to the All-Australian team at the 1986 State of Origin Carnival. He is mostly remembered by West Coast fans for kicking West Coast's first ever goal.

References
Holmesby, Russell and Main, Jim (2007). The Encyclopedia of AFL Footballers. 7th ed. Melbourne: Bas Publishing.

External links

Laurie Keene player profile page at WAFL FootyFacts

1961 births
Living people
West Coast Eagles players
Subiaco Football Club players
Western Australian State of Origin players
All-Australians (1953–1988)
Australian rules footballers from Western Australia